The Minnesota Division of Homeland Security and Emergency Management (HSEM) is a division under the Minnesota Department of Public Safety. It was founded in 1951 as the Minnesota Department of Civil Defense, the name was changed after the inception of the United States Department of Homeland Security in 2002. The Division of Homeland Security and Emergency Management helps Minnesotans prevent, prepare for, respond to and recover from disasters and works to keep Minnesota secure from acts of terrorism. As of 2019, the division has 68 full time employees.

History 
Minnesota created its Department of Civil Defense in 1951 when C. Elmer Anderson was Minnesota's governor and color television was introduced.  Today the division is called Homeland Security and Emergency Management.  Since its inception, the way things are done has changed dramatically, but keeping Minnesota ready for disasters whether they are caused by humans or mother nature has remained consistent. In the past 10 years our country has lived through the attacks of September 11, and the force of Hurricane Katrina.  Closer to home, Minnesota has experienced 12 presidentially declared major disasters and four emergency declarations including the collapse of the I-35W Mississippi River bridge collapse in downtown Minneapolis.

The financial impact of disasters on communities and individuals can be devastating.  HSEM brings in millions of dollars in response, recovery, mitigation and education funding every year.

The radiological emergency planning (REP) division works with Minnesota's two nuclear power plants for evaluation, planning and response, including any hostile action based (HAB) incidents

Staff

Administration 
 Director: Joe Kelly (2015-Present)
 Deputy Director: Kevin Reed

Branch Chiefs 
 Administration and Grants: Michelle Turbeville
 Preparedness/Recovery/Mitigation: Brian Olson
 Operations and Training: Joseph Neuberger

Regional Program Coordinators 
HSEM has six regional program staff assigned throughout the State to assist County and local jurisdictions.
 (SE) Mike Peterson
 (NE) Roy Holmes
 (NW) Heather Winkleblack
 (WC) Lisa Dumont
 (SW) Mark Marcy
 (Metro) Jon Dotterer
HSEM has several division which serve public safety in Minnesota

Operations Division

 Cassie Calametti-Operations Chief
 Brad Winger- Operations Officer
 Mark Kam-Operations Officer
 Mike Earp-Operations Officer
 Brian Curtice-Operations Officer
 Jacob Beauregard-Operations Officer
 Andrew Tepfer-Operations Officer
 Nick Radke-Operations Officer

School Safety Division

 Randy Johnson-Director
 Kasey Cable
 Jennifer Larrive
 Jon Jorgensen
 Connie Forster

HSEM Regions 
The Minnesota Division of Homeland Security and Emergency Management is divided into six regions with varying characteristics listed below. Population Estimates are based on the 2010 United States census.

References

Specialist law enforcement agencies of the United States
Organizations based in Minnesota